Major-General John Talbot Coke (1841–1912) of Trusley in South Derbyshire was a British Army officer who served in the 25th Foot (King's Own Scottish Borderers) between 1859 and 1901.  He wrote a family history book called "Coke of Trusley, in the County of Derby, and Branches Therefrom; a Family History" which was published in 1880.  He was a Brigade Commander during the Second Boer War having a prominent role in the battles of Spion Kop and the Tugela Heights during the relief of Ladysmith.

Early life and career
John Talbot Coke was born in Trusley on 9 August 1841, he was the eldest son of Honorary Colonel Edward Thomas Coke, a Captain of the 69th Regiment and Diana Talbot, descendant of John Talbot, 1st Earl of Shrewsbury. His Great grandfather was the Reverend D'Ewes Coke, a colliery owner and philanthropist.

He was educated at Harrow and gained his commission in 1859, gaining his Lieutenancy with the 25th Foot in 1861.

Military career
In 1866 he was promoted to Captain while in Canada during the Fenian raids.  By 1888, now a Colonel he was second in command of the King's Own Scottish Borderers in the Sudan and took part in the one sided victory at Suakin for which he was Mentioned in Despatches gaining both the Khedive's Star and a 3rd class Medjidie.  In 1889 he was involved in operations on the Nile, presumably as part of the war against the Mahdist's.

John T Coke was Assistant Adjutant General at Headquarters in Ireland 1891, in the Curragh district (County Kildare) 1894 and Deputy Adjutant General in Aldershot Command 1886. He was colonel on the Staff commanding the troops in British Mauritius at the outbreak of the Second Boer War in late 1899.

Second Boer War

Talbot Coke was appointed to a field command and left for South Africa as Commanding officer of the 10th Brigade, part of General Sir Charles Warren's Division of the Natal Field Force which joined in the effort to relieve Ladysmith shortly after the battle of Colenso.

Spion Kop

Sir Redvers Buller now devised a plan to launch a two pronged offensive across the Tugela River and therefore ordered General Warren to lead the main force across at Trichardt's drift and attack the Boer right flank however, when they did cross (almost a week later) Warren quickly realised he would not get far unless they could take and hold the summit of a commanding position called Spion Kop.  Major General Edward Woodgate was selected to lead the attack as Coke was still recovering from a broken leg. Woodgate successfully lead his troops at night to what he believed was the summit where they dully entrenched themselves however when day broke and the fog lifted they came under heavy fire from higher up on the hilltop and Woodgate himself was killed along with most of his subordinate officers.  Warren sent Coke's brigade to reinforce the position but was ordered by Buller to put Lieutenant Colonel Alexander Thorneycroft in command of the summit.  Coke never made it to the summit himself and there was a breakdown in communications which ultimately led to Thorneycroft being left to make the decision to withdraw.

Tugela Heights

A further attempt was made at the Battle of Vaal Krantz between the 5 to 7 February but Coke's brigade were in reserve during this; the Vaal Krantz ridge was taken but was decided that it didn't offer any tactical advantage so another withdrawal was ordered.

On 14 February Coke's brigade joined Barton's and Wynne's infantry brigades (the 6th and 11th brigades) along with the artillery in occupying Hussar Hill which had been captured by the South African Light Horse.

Later life

After returning home from the Boer War, Talbot Coke was placed on the retired list with honorary rank of Major-general in March 1901. On 11 May 1907, he was appointed a deputy lieutenant of Derbyshire.

Family
He was married on 14 November 1867 to Charlotte FitzGerald, a daughter of Major H FitzGerald and descendant of the ancient Earls of Desmond.  Their eldest son Edward Sacheverell D'Ewes Coke would become a Brigadier general and their fifth child, a daughter named Charlotte Geraldine would marry Lieutenant general Thomas D'Oyly Snow KCB, KCMG.

References

External links
 

 

1841 births
1912 deaths
John Talbot Coke
People educated at Harrow School
British Army major generals
British Army personnel of the Second Boer War
British Army personnel of the Mahdist War
King's Own Scottish Borderers officers
Deputy Lieutenants of Derbyshire
People from South Derbyshire District
Military personnel from Derbyshire